Antonio Nappo is a Canadian actor. He is best known for his roles in Four Brothers, Saw II, Land of the Dead, Bad Blood, and Born to be Blue. He also is the voice of Jimmy Falcone (McDougal) in Fugget About It.

Biography
An Italian-Canadian, Tony was born and raised in Scarborough, Ontario, Canada. He attended the University of Toronto for two years before transferring to the American Academy of Dramatic Arts in New York City where he graduated in 1991.

Career

Television
In the first season of the based on real events crime-drama Bad Blood (2017-2018) Nappo played crime family "soldier" Gio.

Nappo plays maintenance guy Paul in the first season of TV series Strays (2021-) and also when the show returned for a second season in September, 2022.

Theatre
Nappo took on the role of Michael in a 2013 run of the play God of Carnage at the Panasonic Theatre.

In the 2015 production (plus its 2017 encore run) of Nicolas Billon’s play Butcher, a dark thriller set in a police station in Toronto, Nappo played Inspector Lamb who's trying to unravel the unfolding mystery.

Filmography

Film

Television

References

External links
 

Year of birth missing (living people)
Living people
Canadian male film actors
Canadian male television actors
Canadian male voice actors
Canadian people of Italian descent
Male actors from Toronto
People from Scarborough, Toronto